'R. Gandhi' is an Indian politician and incumbent Minister for Handlooms and Textiles of Tamil Nadu. He was elected to the Tamil Nadu legislative assembly from Ranipet constituency as a Dravida Munnetra Kazhagam (DMK) candidate in 1996, 2006  2016 and 2021 elections.

He was DMK Vellore district secretary (United Vellore district) for more than two decade. Also now he is Ranipet district DMK secretary.

Electoral performance

References 

Living people
Dravida Munnetra Kazhagam politicians
Tamil Nadu MLAs 1996–2001
Tamil Nadu MLAs 2006–2011
Tamil Nadu MLAs 2016–2021
Year of birth missing (living people)
Tamil Nadu MLAs 2021–2026
Tamil Nadu politicians